Brigadier Rai Singh Yadav, MVC (17 March 1925 – 23 March 2017) was an officer in the Indian Army notable for his  participation in the Nathu La and Cho La clashes 1967. He displayed exemplary courage and leadership during the clashes, for which he was awarded the Maha Vir Chakra, India's second highest military decoration. He is also known as the Tiger of Nathu La.

Early life
Rai Singh Yadav was born in the village of Kosli in Gurgaon district of Punjab Province (now in Rewari district of Haryana) on 17 March 1925. His father was Rai Sahib Ganpat Singh who had served in the British Indian Army in 1920s. Rai Singh passed his Senior Cambridge from King George Military School, Jullundur.

Military career
Rai Singh joined the Army as a sepoy in 1944. He was commissioned into 2 Grenadiers on 10 December 1950.

In 1967, with the rank of Lt Col, he was commanding the 2 Grenadiers battalion deployed at Nathu La, Sikkim, when the Chinese Army attempted incursions into Indian held territory, leading to the Nathu La and Cho La clashes. In order to hold on to the Nathu La pass and defeat the Chinese attempted incursions, Lt Col Rai Singh led his men from the front and displayed conspicuous bravery and exceptional leadership in the face of the enemy.

In popular culture
Brigadier Rai Singh Yadav's character was played by Bollywood actor Arjun Rampal in the 2018 Indian Hindi-language film Paltan (film).

See also 
 Nathu La and Cho La clashes

Further reading
 Maj Gen DK Palit, War in the High Himalayas, Lancers

References

Recipients of the Maha Vir Chakra
People from Rewari district
Indian generals
Military personnel from Haryana
1925 births
2017 deaths